The Yearling is a 1994 American made-for-television coming-of-age drama film based on the 1938 novel The Yearling by Marjorie Kinnan Rawlings. It was produced by RHI Entertainment, sponsored by Kraft General Foods and broadcast on CBS on April 24, 1994. It is also a remake of the 1946 theatrical film The Yearling starring Gregory Peck and Jane Wyman.

Premise 
A young, impoverished 12-year-old boy named Jody Baxter (Wil Horneff), the lone surviving child of four, lives on a farm in 1870s Florida Everglades shortly after the American Civil War. Jody develops a lasting bond with an orphaned deer named Flag.

Cast 
 Peter Strauss as Ezra "Penny" Baxter
 Jean Smart as Ora Baxter
 Philip Seymour Hoffman as Buck
 Wil Horneff as Jody Baxter
 Jarred Blancard as Fodder-Wing
 Brad Greenquist as Lem Forrester
 Mary Nell Santcroc as Ma Forrester
 Richard Hamilton as Pa Forrester
 Scott Sowers as Boyle
 Ed Grady as Doc Wilson
 Susan F. Allen as Lyla
 Kerry Wallum as James
 Bart Hansard as Milwheel

Reception 
Reviewer Drew Voros of Variety wrote that "the absence of true grit and dirt-under-fingernails feeling weaken the believability of the drama," though "like the novel and the ’46 film version, death is taken very seriously, and life is not taken for granted. For this alone, despite the glitches, young viewers should be encouraged to watch."

References

External links 
 
 
 

1994 films
1994 television films
1990s coming-of-age drama films
1990s teen drama films
American coming-of-age films
Remakes of American films
American teen drama films
CBS network films
American drama television films
1990s English-language films
Films about animals
Films about deer and moose
Films about families
Films directed by Rod Hardy
Films about pets
Films scored by Lee Holdridge
Films set in the 1870s
Films set in Florida
1994 drama films
1990s American films